Alfred Dürr (3 March 1918 – 7 April 2011) was a German musicologist. He was a principal editor of the Neue Bach-Ausgabe, the second edition of the complete works of Johann Sebastian Bach.

Professional career 
Dürr studied musicology and Classical philology at the Georg-August-Universität Göttingen from 1945 to 1950. He wrote his thesis about Bach's early cantatas. From 1951 until his retirement in 1983 he was an employee of the Johann Sebastian Bach Institute in Göttingen, West Germany, from 1962 to 1981 its deputy director.  His work involved collaboration with colleagues in East Germany.
He was a principal editor of the Neue Bach-Ausgabe, a project which was divided between the Johann Sebastian Bach Institute and the Bach-Archiv Leipzig in East Germany. From 1953 to 1974 Dürr was editor of the Bach-Jahrbuch (Bach almanach), together with Werner Neumann, the founder and director of the Bach-Archiv Leipzig.

Dürr received honorary doctorates of music from the Humboldt-Universität zu Berlin, the University of Oxford and Baldwin–Wallace College in Ohio. His 65th birthday was marked by a Festschrift Bachiana et alia musicologica (ed. W. Rehm, Kassel, 1983).

Alfred Dürr died on 7 April 2011 in Göttingen.

Research and editing 
Dürr wrote standard works on the Bach cantatas (1971) and on The Well-Tempered Clavier, which are of interest not only to specialists, but also to the general public. In 1957 he published in the Bach-Jahrbuch Zur Chronologie der Leipziger Vokalwerke J. S. Bachs. In 1988 his book on Bach's St John Passion, Die Johannes-Passion von Johann Sebastian Bach, he explored theological aspects as well as the four versions of the work.

Dating of Bach's works 
Many of Bach's works have uncertain composition dates, and the standard catalogue, the Bach-Werke-Verzeichnis, is not a chronological one.  Nevertheless, modern scholarship has been able to throw light on the chronology. Dürr's "painstaking work" changed the accepted chronology of Bach's works, especially his cantatas.
The musicologist John Butt remarked:
If one had to single out the scholar who has done most to establish the new chronology of Bach's vocal works and who appears most often as an editor within the Neue Bach-Ausgabe, this would surely have to be Dürr.

Selected publications 
 Johann Sebastian Bach. Die Kantaten. Bärenreiter, Kassel 1999. 
 translation: The Cantatas of J. S. Bach
 Johann Sebastian Bach. Das Wohltemperierte Klavier. Bärenreiter, Kassel 2002. 
Entries for Alfred Dürr in the Library of Congress
Entries for Alfred Dürr in WorldCat

References

External links 
 
Alfred Dürr International Who's Who in Music and Musicians' Directory
 Hans Heinrich Eggebrecht and Konrad Küster. "Dürr, Alfred". Grove Music Online. Oxford Music Online.
 Alfred Dürr Hans Heinrich Eggebrecht, Konrad Küster
 Alfred Dürr encyclopedia.com

Musicologists from Berlin
1918 births
2011 deaths
Bach scholars
Musicians from Berlin
People from Charlottenburg